Noginsk is a city and the administrative center of Noginsky District in Moscow Oblast, Russia, located  east of the Moscow Ring Road on the Klyazma River. Population:

History
Founded in 1389 as Rogozhi, the town was later renamed Bogorodsk (lit. [a town] of the Mother of God) by a Catherine the Great's decree in 1781, when it was granted town status. Throughout the 19th century and for a good part of the 20th century, the town was a major textile center, processing cotton, silk, and wool. In 1930, the town  was renamed Noginsk after Bolshevik Viktor Nogin.

Administrative and municipal status
Within the framework of administrative divisions, Noginsk serves as the administrative center of Noginsky District. As an administrative division, it is, together with five rural localities, incorporated within Noginsky District as the City of Noginsk. As a municipal division, the City of Noginsk is incorporated within Noginsky Municipal District as Noginsk Urban Settlement.

Economy
The city's industrial production is concentrated on ceramics (two major holdings), food (Biserovo fisheries and a fish factory in Noginsk), beverage (one of Russia's biggest beverage producers is located near Noginsk), and construction materials.

Transportation
Noginsk is a transport hub, being the intersection of the Nizhny Novgorod Highway, M7 (E22), and the Moscow Minor Ring road.

Rapid transit development plans include possible construction of a direct high-speed railway line connecting Noginsk to the prospective Serp i Molot railway/metro terminal or Shosse Entuziastov metro station. Public transportation system consists of buses and trams. Noginsk's current commuters' travel to and from Moscow on the M7 Moscow-Nizhny-Novgorod Highway. There is also an indirect railway line going through Fryazevo—the line running the first  southward, whereas Moscow lies due west of Noginsk. It was built in the late 19th century for the purposes of the textile industry and is still in use.

Politics
Vladimir Laptev was the Head of Noginsk until 2005. As of 2014, Vladimir Khvatov serves as the Head of the city.

Media

Points of interest
the Bogorodsk-Glukhovo factory opened by Savva Vasilyevich Morozov in 1830.
the oldest monument to Vladimir Lenin (1924)

Notable people
Pavel Alexandrov (1896–1982), mathematician
Grigory Fedotov (1916–1957), association football player
Vladimir Fortov (1946-2020), physicist, a member of the Russian Academy of Sciences
Vladimir Korotkov (born 1941), professional football coach and a former player
Anatoly Ivanovich Lipinsky (born 1959), counter admiral
Pimen I of Moscow (1910–1990), head of the Russian Orthodox Church
Vladimir Serbsky (1858–1917), one of the founders of the forensic psychiatry in Russia
Igor Spassky (born 1926), submarine designer
Igor Talankin (1927–2010), film director and screenwriter
Sergei Yeliseyev (born 1961), Russian sailors
Renat Yanbayev (born 1984), association football player

References

Notes

Sources

External links

Official website of Noginsk 
Unofficial website of Noginsk 
Bogorodsk/Noginsk history resource 

Cities and towns in Moscow Oblast
Populated places in Noginsky District
Bogorodsky Uyezd
1389 establishments in Europe
14th-century establishments in Russia
Populated places established in the 1380s